The Sacred Heart Pioneers are the 32 sports teams (14 men, 18 women) representing Sacred Heart University in Fairfield, Connecticut in intercollegiate athletics. The Pioneers compete in the NCAA Division I and are members of the Northeast Conference (the school's primary conference), Atlantic Hockey, Eastern Intercollegiate Wrestling Association, and New England Women's Hockey Alliance.

History
Nearly 800 students participate in the university's 31 athletic teams (17 female teams and 14 male teams) along with more than 500 students who participate in 23 Club Sports.

The football team plays at the Football Championship Subdivision level and claims an FCS title in 2001.  Their biggest rivalry is with the oldest public university in Connecticut, Central Connecticut State University, in what has been dubbed the Constitution State Rivalry.

The men's basketball team won the Division II national title in 1986.

The women's basketball team won the Northeast Conference regular season title five times and the conference tournament three times and earned three trips to the NCAA Tournament.

The baseball team has won four Northeast Conference tournament titles and made four NCAA tournament appearances, formerly led by Super Bowl XVII champion, Nick Giaquinto.  The four conference titles are tied for the most in the conference.

The men's golf team won the Northeast Conference title in May 2008, 2009 and 2011.

The men's fencing team won the Northeast Conference title five years in a row (2010–14) and was ranked #9 in 2011.

On February 21, 2013, the Sacred Heart University athletics department hired longtime Major League Baseball player and manager Bobby Valentine as the athletic director.

On June 8, 2021, the Sacred Heart University athletics department named Judy Ann Riccio as its interim athletic director, replacing Bobby Valentine who took a leave of absence.

The men's ice hockey program competes in the Atlantic Hockey conference, and the women's hockey program competes in the newly-created New England Women's Hockey Alliance (NEWHA) and won the conference's initial tournament title in the 2017-18 season, beating out institutions such as the College of the Holy Cross and Saint Anselm College.

The wrestling team competes in the Eastern Intercollegiate Wrestling Association and the field hockey team competes in the Metro Atlantic Athletic Conference. Men's volleyball competed in the Eastern Intercollegiate Volleyball Association through the 2022 season, after which the NEC began sponsoring that sport.

On September 21, 2020, Sacred Heart announced the addition of a women's wrestling program, the second for a Division I institution (the first being Presbyterian College) and the first in the Northeast region. The program will start in the fall of 2021.

Sports sponsored

Club sports 
Currently there are twenty-eight club sports active on campus. The active clubs are:

Baseball
Men's Basketball
Women's Basketball
Bowling
Dance Team
Field Hockey
Figure Skating
Gymnastics
Golf
Esports
Men's Football
Men's Ice Hockey
Men's Lacrosse
Women's Lacrosse
Men's Rugby
Women's Rugby
Running
Sailing
Chess
Men's Soccer
Women's Soccer
Softball
Men's Swimming
Tennis
Ultimate Frisbee
Men's Volleyball
Women's Volleyball
Weightlifting

References

External links
 

 
Sports teams in the New York metropolitan area
Rugby union teams in Connecticut